Magnolia Ballpark was a ballpark located in Beaumont, Texas and home to the Texas League Beaumont Exporters from 1920 to 1932.The right field foul line measured 260 feet. The ballpark was located on Magnolia Ave. between Hazel and Long streets.

Sources
 "Baseball in the Lone Star State: Texas League's Greatest Hits," Tom Kayser and David King, Trinity University Press 2005
 "The Texas League 1888-1987: A Century of Baseball," Bill O'Neal, c.1987

References

Baseball in Beaumont, Texas
Baseball venues in Texas
Sports venues in Beaumont, Texas
Minor league baseball venues
Defunct baseball venues in the United States
Demolished sports venues in Texas